Miss Malaysia World 1989, the 24th edition of the Miss World Malaysia pageant was held on September 19, 1989, at the Shangri-La Hotel in Kuala Lumpur. Miss Malaysia World 1988, Sue Wong crowned her successor, Vivian Chen from Sarawak at the end of the event. She then represented Malaysia at Miss World 1989.

This year's event offers RM6000 cash to the winner, RM2000 to the first runner-up, RM1000 to the second runner-up and RM750 to the third runner-up. Present were Miss Singapore World 1989, Jacqueline Ang.

Results

Contestants

References 

Miss World
1989
1989 in Malaysia
1989 beauty pageants
History of Kuala Lumpur